Homenetmen Beirut, or simply Homenetmen, is the basketball department of Homenetmen, a Lebanese-Armenian multi-sports club based in Beirut, Lebanon. The club was established in 1924 in Beirut and is part of the worldwide pan-Armenian Homenetmen association.

Homenetmen Beirut was founded in 1924, and is one of the oldest teams in the league. It won its first Lebanese League Championship in 2018, with coach Joe Moujaes, in a final against Riyadi Club.

Homenetmen Beirut has a long-running program for basketball in the Lebanese Basketball League for both men and women and has been one of the pioneers of the sports from the day of its foundation in 1918.

Among the well-known top class players that have played with the club over the years are: Justin Gray, Dion Dixon, Joe Vogel, Rashad McCants, Fadi El Khatib, Ahmad Ibrahim, Ismail Ahmad, Sam Young, Bassem Balaa, Michael Fraser, Kevin Galloway, DeWayne Jackson, Ater Majok, Norvel Pelle, Nadim Souaid, Sam Thompson, Justin Tubbs, Mike Taylor, Nate Robinson, and Chris Johnson.

History

2003–2013: Second Division years

In 2003, Homenetmen was relegated from the Lebanese Basketball first division. The club played for the first time in history in the Lebanese basketball’s second division. After playing for one season in the second division the club qualified back to the first division in 2004 but was unable to play due to financial crisis. For years, the club fought for a place in the play-offs of the second division but ended up getting knocked out. In 2012, Homenetmen reached the playoff semifinals but lost the series. In 2013, Homenetmen became the champions of the second division and got qualified to the Lebanese Basketball first division.

2013–present

Back to First Division

Homenetmen ended a 10-year wait for top-flight promotion to the Lebanese basketball’s first division as they claimed the final series comfortably 3–0 after a 58–51 victory over Tadamon Zouk. The Armenian side would play in the first division for the first time since the 2004–2005 season.

2013–2014

The season started poorly with just 2 wins out of 6 games which led Homenetmen to fire their Serbian coach Nenad Krzic, released Justin Gray from the team. The club finished the regular season 6th and  faced Amchit in the playoffs. The series ended 3–0 for Amchit.

Before the start of the 2014–2015 season and due to problems with the Basketball Committee and with the President Guy Manoukian, Homenetmen’s Central Committee  formed a new Basketball committee, the team signed Mike Fraiser, Jimmy Salem, Mattiew Dib and the ex-NBA player Rashad McCants under the guidance of coach Joe Moujaes. Homenetmen finished the regular season 7th and faced Sagesse in the playoffs. During the playoffs, Homenetmen would re-sign Dion Dixon and release Rashad McCants. Sagesse won the series 3–1 with a one-point win in the last match.

2014–2015

The 2014–2015 season was horrible to the Homenetmen family because of the poor results. The Homenetmen Central Committee dissolved the newly assigned Basketball Committee and reassigned the former Basketball Committee headed by the President Guy Manoukian.

2015–2016
Homenetmen started the league with a 3–0 winning streak defeating Champville, Byblos and Louaize but lost to Riyadi. Homenetmen was down 2–0 against hoops in the quarter finals where they fired Jusin Tubbs and signed Kevin Galloway. They managed to win the series 2–3. They reached their objective and qualified for the semi-finals for the first time in the history of LBL, but got knocked out of semi Finals by Al Riyadi Club 2–4.

2016–2017
Homenetmen finished the season top of the league with 17 wins and 1 loss and routing the second round with 6 wins. For the 4th consecutive year Homenetmen entered the playoff, won 3–0 over Champville SC, Homenetmen went to the semi-finals of the playoffs against Mouttahed, the series ended 3–1. In the Finals Homenetmen faced Al Riyadi and were defeated 2–4. 

2017–2018

Homenetmen won the Henri Chalhoub Tournament on October 1, 2017 hosted by the newly promoted First Division club Beirut by winning 58–50. Homenetmen won the Arab Club Championship against ASS Sale 99–98.

Homenetmen won the Lebanese Cup by beating Al Riyadi 77–70, on May 2, 2018. Homenetmen ended the regular season with a 21–5 score and secured the home court advantage. It swept the series 3–0 against Louaizi and faced Sagesse in the semis-finals of the playoffs. Homenetmen crushed Sagesse 4–0 and went to face Al Riyadi in the Finals.

The Lebanese Basketball League (LBL) has long been ruled by the two clubs – Sagesse and Al Riyadi. But this time around, it was Homenetmen Beirut BC that rose to the top and claimed their first Lebanese Basketball League title in the club's history. In a seven-game series that went the full distance, Homenetmen prevailed in the final game, 74–59. Homenetmen was crowned the Lebanese Basketball League Champions for 2017–2018.

Arena

Homenetmen's long-time home court is the Tenjoukian arena in Mzher, Antelias. The construction of the venue was completed in 2000.  The seating capacity is 600, however the arena can hold up to a capacity of more than maximum 800 when standing.

Squad

Achievements
Lebanese Basketball League (1):
2017-2018
 Lebanese Cup Winner (1):
2018
 Lebanese Basketball Second Division 2 (2):
2003-2004, 2012-2013
 Houssam Edin El Hariri Tournament (1):
2016
 Henri Chalhoub Tournament (1):
2017
Syrian Basketball Super Cup
Quarterfinals: 2022
Arab Club Championship (1): 
2017

Women's Basketball Program
The Homenetmen Antelias are a professional basketball team based in Antelias, playing in the Women's Lebanese Basketball League (WLBL). They compete in the first division. They won the Lebanese league in seasons 2015-2016 and 2016-2017 and the Arab Club Women's Championship in 2017.

See also
Homenetmen Lebanon
 Homenetmen Beirut F.C.
 Homenetmen Antelias
 Homenetmen Bourj Hammoud

References

External links
Official site 

Basketball teams in Lebanon
Basketball teams established in 1924
Sport in Beirut
Homenetmen Beirut
Diaspora sports clubs
1918 establishments in the Ottoman Empire
Organisations based in Beirut